Sungai Pandan Waterfall (Malay: Air Terjun Sungai Pandan) located 25 km from Kuantan town at Felda Panching Selatan Pahang .

Facilities 
 Surau
 Paved road
 Parking area
 Toilet
 Suspension bridge
 Trails
 BBQ

References

See also 
 Geography of Malaysia

Waterfalls of Malaysia